David Lyons (born 10 May 1985) is an English rugby union player for London Irish in the RFU Championship. He plays at lock. He previously played for the Worcester Warriors, Moseley and Cornish Pirates .

References

1985 births
Living people
Worcester Warriors players
Moseley Rugby Football Club players
Cornish Pirates players
English rugby union players
Rugby union players from Wolverhampton
Rugby union locks